Rudki may refer to:
Rudki, Kuyavian-Pomeranian Voivodeship (north-central Poland)
Rudki, West Pomeranian Voivodeship (north-west Poland)
Rudki, Tomaszów Lubelski County in Lublin Voivodeship (east Poland)
Rudki, Kielce County in Świętokrzyskie Voivodeship (south-central Poland)
Rudki, Staszów County in Świętokrzyskie Voivodeship (south-central Poland)
Rudki, Grójec County in Masovian Voivodeship (east-central Poland)
Rudki, Zwoleń County in Masovian Voivodeship (east-central Poland)
Rudki, Chodzież County in Greater Poland Voivodeship (west-central Poland)
Rudki, Gniezno County in Greater Poland Voivodeship (west-central Poland)
Rudki, Szamotuły County in Greater Poland Voivodeship (west-central Poland)
Rudki, Września County in Greater Poland Voivodeship (west-central Poland)
Polish name for Rudky in Ukraine

See also
 Rudaki (disambiguation)